Conassiminea zheni is a species of minute operculate snail, a marine gastropod mollusk or micromollusk in the family Assimineidae.

Distribution
This marine species is endemic to Australia and occurs among roots in mangroves off Victoria.

References

External links
 Conassiminea zheni Fukuda & Ponder, 2006; Atlas of Living Australia

Assimineidae
Gastropods described in 2006
Gastropods of Australia